Vadym Kyrylov (born 2 June 1981) is a Moldovan football striker who played for Naftovyk in the Ukrainian Premier League.

References

External links

 Profile on Official Website
 Profile at the Ukrainian Football Portal

1981 births
Living people
People from Odesa Oblast
Ukrainian emigrants to Moldova
Moldovan footballers
Moldovan expatriate footballers
Expatriate footballers in Ukraine
Moldovan expatriate sportspeople in Ukraine
CS Tiligul-Tiras Tiraspol players
FC Karpaty-2 Lviv players
FC Hoverla Uzhhorod players
FC Metalurh Zaporizhzhia players
FC Zorya Luhansk players
FC Desna Chernihiv players
FC Nyva Ternopil players
FC Naftovyk-Ukrnafta Okhtyrka players
FC Oleksandriya players
FC Balkany Zorya players
Association football forwards